Nagorny (masculine), Nagornaya (feminine), or Nagornoye (neuter) is the name of several inhabited localities in Russia.

Modern inhabited localities

Altai Krai
As of 2010, three rural localities in Altai Krai bear this name:
Nagorny, Biysk, Altai Krai, a settlement under the administrative jurisdiction of the city of krai significance of Biysk
Nagorny, Pavlovsky District, Altai Krai, a settlement in Prutskoy Selsoviet of Pavlovsky District
Nagorny, Topchikhinsky District, Altai Krai, a settlement in Krasnoyarsky Selsoviet of Topchikhinsky District

Amur Oblast
As of 2010, one rural locality in Amur Oblast bears this name:
Nagorny, Amur Oblast, a settlement in Yekaterinoslavsky Rural Settlement of Oktyabrsky District

Chechen Republic
As of 2010, one rural locality in the Chechen Republic bears this name:
Nagornoye, Chechen Republic, a selo in Groznensky District

Chelyabinsk Oblast
As of 2010, two rural localities in Chelyabinsk Oblast bear this name:
Nagorny, Sosnovsky District, Chelyabinsk Oblast, a settlement in Solnechny Selsoviet of Sosnovsky District
Nagorny, Uvelsky District, Chelyabinsk Oblast, a settlement in Kichiginsky Selsoviet of Uvelsky District

Chuvash Republic
As of 2010, two rural localities in the Chuvash Republic bear this name:
Nagornoye, Chuvash Republic, a village in Persirlanskoye Rural Settlement of Yadrinsky District
Nagornaya, Chuvash Republic, a village in Shumshevashskoye Rural Settlement of Alikovsky District

Irkutsk Oblast
As of 2010, one rural locality in Irkutsk Oblast bears this name:
Nagorny, Irkutsk Oblast, a settlement in Chunsky District

Kaliningrad Oblast
As of 2010, five rural localities in Kaliningrad Oblast bear this name:
Nagornoye, Bagrationovsky District, Kaliningrad Oblast, a settlement in Dolgorukovsky Rural Okrug of Bagrationovsky District
Nagornoye, Chernyakhovsky District, Kaliningrad Oblast, a settlement in Kaluzhsky Rural Okrug of Chernyakhovsky District
Nagornoye, Guryevsky District, Kaliningrad Oblast, a settlement in Nizovsky Rural Okrug of Guryevsky District
Nagornoye, Ozyorsky District, Kaliningrad Oblast, a settlement in Novostroyevsky Rural Okrug of Ozyorsky District
Nagornoye, Pravdinsky District, Kaliningrad Oblast, a settlement in Domnovsky Rural Okrug of Pravdinsky District

Kamchatka Krai
As of 2010, one rural locality in Kamchatka Krai bears this name:
Nagorny, Kamchatka Krai, a settlement in Yelizovsky District

Kemerovo Oblast
As of 2010, one rural locality in Kemerovo Oblast bears this name:
Nagorny, Kemerovo Oblast, a settlement in Plotnikovskaya Rural Territory of Prokopyevsky District

Khabarovsk Krai
As of 2010, one rural locality in Khabarovsk Krai bears this name:
Nagornoye, Khabarovsk Krai, a selo in Khabarovsky District

Kirov Oblast
As of 2010, one rural locality in Kirov Oblast bears this name:
Nagornaya, Kirov Oblast, a village in Izhevsky Rural Okrug of Pizhansky District

Kostroma Oblast
As of 2010, one rural locality in Kostroma Oblast bears this name:
Nagornoye, Kostroma Oblast, a village in Tsentralnoye Settlement of Buysky District

Krasnoyarsk Krai
As of 2010, two rural localities in Krasnoyarsk Krai bear this name:
Nagornoye, Krasnoyarsk Krai, a selo in Nagornovsky Selsoviet of Sayansky District
Nagornaya, Krasnoyarsk Krai, a village in Yudinsky Selsoviet of Irbeysky District

Kursk Oblast
As of 2010, two rural localities in Kursk Oblast bear this name:
Nagorny, Fatezhsky District, Kursk Oblast, a khutor in Soldatsky Selsoviet of Fatezhsky District
Nagorny, Oboyansky District, Kursk Oblast, a khutor in Bykanovsky Selsoviet of Oboyansky District

Leningrad Oblast
As of 2010, one rural locality in Leningrad Oblast bears this name:
Nagornoye, Leningrad Oblast, a logging depot settlement in Krasnoselskoye Settlement Municipal Formation of Vyborgsky District

Lipetsk Oblast
As of 2010, one rural locality in Lipetsk Oblast bears this name:
Nagornoye, Lipetsk Oblast, a selo in Terbunsky Selsoviet of Terbunsky District

Republic of Mordovia
As of 2010, two rural localities in the Republic of Mordovia bear this name:
Nagorny, Republic of Mordovia, a settlement in Malobereznikovsky Selsoviet of Romodanovsky District
Nagornaya, Republic of Mordovia, a village in Starokacheyevsky Selsoviet of Tengushevsky District

Moscow Oblast
As of 2010, five rural localities in Moscow Oblast bear this name:
Nagornoye, Petrovskoye Rural Settlement, Klinsky District, Moscow Oblast, a village in Petrovskoye Rural Settlement of Klinsky District
Nagornoye, Klin Town, Klinsky District, Moscow Oblast, a village under the administrative jurisdiction of  thetown of  Klin, Klinsky District
Nagornoye, Mytishchinsky District, Moscow Oblast, a settlement under the administrative jurisdiction of   the town of  Mytishchi, Mytishchinsky District
Nagornoye, Tsarevskoye Rural Settlement, Pushkinsky District, Moscow Oblast, a settlement in Tsarevskoye Rural Settlement of Pushkinsky District
Nagornoye, Zelenogradsky Suburban Settlement, Pushkinsky District, Moscow Oblast, a village under the administrative jurisdiction of  the suburban settlement of  Zelenogradsky, Pushkinsky District

Nizhny Novgorod Oblast
As of 2010, four rural localities in Nizhny Novgorod Oblast bear this name:
Nagorny, Nizhny Novgorod Oblast, a settlement in Sitnikovsky Selsoviet of Bor, Nizhny Novgorod Oblast
Nagornoye, Chkalovsky District, Nizhny Novgorod Oblast, a village in Kuznetsovsky Selsoviet of Chkalovsky District
Nagornoye, Shakhunsky District, Nizhny Novgorod Oblast, a village in Khmelevitsky Selsoviet of Shakhunsky District
Nagornoye, Voskresensky District, Nizhny Novgorod Oblast, a village in Bogorodsky Selsoviet of Voskresensky District

Novosibirsk Oblast
As of 2010, one rural locality in Novosibirsk Oblast bears this name:
Nagornoye, Novosibirsk Oblast, a selo in Kuybyshevsky District

Omsk Oblast
As of 2010, one rural locality in Omsk Oblast bears this name:
Nagornoye, Omsk Oblast, a selo in Nagorno-Ivanovsky Rural Okrug of Tarsky District

Orenburg Oblast
As of 2010, one rural locality in Orenburg Oblast bears this name:
Nagorny, Orenburg Oblast, a settlement in Yasnogorsky Selsoviet of Novosergiyevsky District

Oryol Oblast
As of 2010, two rural localities in Oryol Oblast bear this name:
Nagorny, Oryol Oblast, a settlement in Zdorovetsky Selsoviet of Livensky District
Nagornaya, Oryol Oblast, a village in Nizhne-Zalegoshchensky Selsoviet of Zalegoshchensky District

Perm Krai
As of 2010, one rural locality in Perm Krai bears this name:
Nagornaya, Perm Krai, a village under the administrative jurisdiction of the city of krai significance of Krasnokamsk

Primorsky Krai
As of 2010, one rural locality in Primorsky Krai bears this name:
Nagornoye, Primorsky Krai, a selo in Pozharsky District

Pskov Oblast
As of 2010, one rural locality in Pskov Oblast bears this name:
Nagorny, Pskov Oblast, a settlement in Velikoluksky District

Rostov Oblast
As of 2010, one rural locality in Rostov Oblast bears this name:
Nagorny, Rostov Oblast, a settlement in Yuzhnenskoye Rural Settlement of Martynovsky District

Ryazan Oblast
As of 2010, two rural localities in Ryazan Oblast bear this name:
Nagornoye, Ryazhsky District, Ryazan Oblast, a selo in Nagornovsky Rural Okrug of Ryazhsky District
Nagornoye, Rybnovsky District, Ryazan Oblast, a village in Baturinsky Rural Okrug of Rybnovsky District

Sakha Republic
As of 2010, one urban locality in the Sakha Republic bears this name:
Nagorny, Sakha Republic, an urban-type settlement in Neryungrinsky District

Samara Oblast
As of 2010, one rural locality in Samara Oblast bears this name:
Nagorny, Samara Oblast, a settlement in Shentalinsky District

Saratov Oblast
As of 2010, one rural locality in Saratov Oblast bears this name:
Nagorny, Saratov Oblast, a settlement in Lysogorsky District

Stavropol Krai
As of 2010, one rural locality in Stavropol Krai bears this name:
Nagorny, Stavropol Krai, a khutor in Krasny Selsoviet of Grachyovsky District

Republic of Tatarstan
As of 2010, two rural localities in the Republic of Tatarstan bear this name:
Nagorny, Republic of Tatarstan, a settlement in Cheremshansky District
Nagornoye, Republic of Tatarstan, a village in Almetyevsky District

Tyumen Oblast
As of 2010, one rural locality in Tyumen Oblast bears this name:
Nagorny, Tyumen Oblast, a settlement in Ivanovsky Rural Okrug of Uvatsky District

Udmurt Republic
As of 2010, one rural locality in the Udmurt Republic bears this name:
Nagorny, Udmurt Republic, a vyselok under the administrative jurisdiction of  Igra Settlement Council of Igrinsky District

Ulyanovsk Oblast
As of 2010, one rural locality in Ulyanovsk Oblast bears this name:
Nagorny, Ulyanovsk Oblast, a settlement in Nikulinsky Rural Okrug of Nikolayevsky District

Vladimir Oblast
As of 2010, three rural localities in Vladimir Oblast bear this name:
Nagorny, Gus-Khrustalny District, Vladimir Oblast, a settlement in Gus-Khrustalny District
Nagorny, Petushinsky District, Vladimir Oblast, a settlement in Petushinsky District
Nagornoye, Vladimir Oblast, a village in Sudogodsky District

Volgograd Oblast
As of 2010, one rural locality in Volgograd Oblast bears this name:
Nagorny, Volgograd Oblast, a settlement in Verkhnedobrinsky Selsoviet of Kamyshinsky District

Vologda Oblast
As of 2010, two rural localities in Vologda Oblast bear this name:
Nagornoye, Ust-Kubinsky District, Vologda Oblast, a village in Zadneselsky Selsoviet of Ust-Kubinsky District
Nagornoye, Vologodsky District, Vologda Oblast, a village in Spassky Selsoviet of Vologodsky District

Voronezh Oblast
As of 2010, one rural locality in Voronezh Oblast bears this name:
Nagornoye, Voronezh Oblast, a khutor in Morozovskoye Rural Settlement of Rossoshansky District

Yaroslavl Oblast
As of 2010, two rural localities in Yaroslavl Oblast bear this name:
Nagorny, Yaroslavl Oblast, a settlement in Teleginsky Rural Okrug of Yaroslavsky District
Nagornoye, Yaroslavl Oblast, a village in Kurbsky Rural Okrug of Yaroslavsky District

Zabaykalsky Krai
As of 2010, one rural locality in Zabaykalsky Krai bears this name:
Nagorny, Zabaykalsky Krai, a settlement in Nerchinsky District

Historical inhabited localities
Nagorny, a former urban-type settlement in Altai Krai; since 2004—a part of the city of Biysk
Nagorny, a former urban-type settlement in Chukotka Autonomous Okrug; since 2000—a part of the urban-type settlement of Beringovsky

References